{{safesubst:#invoke:RfD|||month = March
|day = 14
|year = 2023
|time = 19:11
|timestamp = 20230314191105

|content=
REDIRECTGyőr

Schools in Hungary
Győr

}}